Real del Castillo Airstrip or Ojos Negros Airstrip is a public dirt airstrip located in Ojos Negros, Municipality of Ensenada, Baja California, Mexico, a town located 38 km East of Ensenada, in the middle of Ojos Negros Valley. The airstrip is used solely for general aviation  purposes, and it has been used as an alternate airstrip to Ensenada Airport during the time of the Baja 1000 road race. The RCO code is used as identifier.

Operations
 Northwest Aeronautical Institute (Ensenada, Tijuana) - training flights only

External links
RCO Info
History of Real del Castillo, B.C.

Airports in Baja California